KBFM (104.1 FM) is a commercial radio station licensed to Edinburg, Texas, carrying a bilingual English/Spanish language rhythmic contemporary format known as "Wild 104". Owned by iHeartMedia, the station serves the Lower Rio Grande Valley. KBFM's studios are located in Weslaco while the station transmitter resides in Bluetown. In addition to a standard analog transmission, KBFM broadcasts in HD Radio using the in-band on-channel standard, and streams online via iHeartRadio.

History
After signing on in 1972, KBFM started out with a broad-based Top 40 direction when it debuted the format on the air in 1974. But in 2004 they shifted to Rhythmic Top 40, thus putting them in competition with KBTQ (which would later exit the format in October 2005). Prior to relaunching as "Wild 104" in February 2004, KBFM has been previously known as "B104".

KBFM changed ownership several times in the mid-1990s, with Calendar Broadcasting selling the station to Tate Communication Inc. in October 1994, with July Communications purchasing it the following year. July Communications sold off KBFM to Cumulus Media in July 1999. Cumulus Media then sold KBFM, along with several other stations, to Clear Channel Communications (since renamed iHeartMedia) by August 2000.

The Mojo Morning Show with lead host Johnny O., originated over KBFM from March 2004 to June 2021; the program was cancelled and replaced with the syndicated Tino Cochino Show.

References

External links

BFM
Rhythmic contemporary radio stations in the United States
Edinburg, Texas
Radio stations established in 1972
IHeartMedia radio stations
1972 establishments in Texas